Blue is the debut studio album by American country singer LeAnn Rimes, released in the United States on July 9, 1996, by Curb Records. It peaked at number three on the US Billboard 200, and number one on the Top Country Albums chart.

Singles released from this album include, in order of release: "Blue", "Hurt Me", "One Way Ticket (Because I Can)", "Unchained Melody" and "The Light in Your Eyes". These songs all charted on the Billboard Hot Country Songs chart between 1996 and 1997; "Blue" and "The Light in Your Eyes" both reached top 10, while "Hurt Me" fell short off top 40. "One Way Ticket" is Rimes's only number one hit on the country music charts.

A special Target edition was released during the 1996 Christmas season, which included a bonus single of "Put a Little Holiday in Your Heart", with "Unchained Melody"  on the B-side. "Unchained Melody" peaked at number three on the Country Songs chart while "Put a Little Holiday in Your Heart" peaked at number 51 on the same chart in 1997.

Reception

The album was met with some positive reviews. AllMusic rated Blue four out of five stars. Shawn M. Haney, who reviewed the album, called it "a glorious free-for-all of sassy pick-me-up country", and stated that "perhaps people of any age or style of interest will feel youthful again after a good listen and a half."  Similarly, Entertainment Weekly gave the album a B+ and stated that "such raw, old-fashioned country music, with such a big, twangy, sexy voice at the center, wouldn't be making such a stir in bland '90s Nashville if LeAnn Rimes weren't 13. In other words, the hype machine has inadvertently coughed up a gem." Los Angeles Times gave the album two-and-a-half stars out of four and said that "Rimes displays the unbridled power and freshness you'd expect from a teenager. In an ideal world, she'd bring all that to bear on songs that tap her youthful zeal. Instead, too many on this major-label debut require a level of experience that's clearly beyond her years. There's no question Rimes has been blessed with a magnificent voice. Let's hope she'll be given a few years--say, at least until she's out of high school--to let her natural talent mature." In his Consumer Guide, however, Robert Christgau gave the album a "neither" score, and said it "may impress once or twice with consistent craft or an arresting track or two.  Then it won't."

Track listing

Personnel

Musicians
 LeAnn Rimes – lead vocals
 Kelly Glenn – keyboards
 Paul Goad – acoustic piano, keyboards, bass 
 John Hobbs – acoustic piano
 Jimmy Kelly – acoustic piano, keyboards
 Mike McClain – acoustic piano
 Steve Nathan – keyboards
 Dann Huff – electric guitar
 John Jorgenson – electric guitar
 Brent Rowan – electric guitar
 Jerry Matheny – acoustic guitar, electric guitar
 Johnny Mulhair – acoustic guitar, electric guitar, steel guitar
 Michael Spriggs – acoustic guitar
 Bruce Bouton – steel guitar
 Milo Deering – steel guitar
 Paul Franklin – steel guitar
 Mike Chapman – bass 
 Curtis Randall – bass
 Bob Smith – bass
 Glenn Worf – bass 
 Brad Billingsley – drums
 Chad Cromwell – drums
 Fred Gleber – drums
 Greg Morrow – drums
 Terry McMillan – percussion
 Kevin Bailey – harmonica
 Larry Franklin – fiddle
 Crista Carnes – backing vocals
 Perry Coleman – backing vocals
 Lisa Criss – backing vocals
 LaDonna Johnson – backing vocals
 Mary Ann Kennedy – backing vocals
 Joy McKay – backing vocals
 Kayla Powell – backing vocals
 Pam Rose – backing vocals
 Matthew Ward – backing vocals
 Dennis Wilson – backing vocals
 Eddy Arnold – lead vocals on "Cattle Call"

Production
 Wilbur C. Rimes – producer
 Chuck Howard – producer (3, 5, 6, 7, 9)
 Johnny Mulhair – co-producer (6, 8, 9, 11), recording, mixing 
 Greg Hunt – recording, mixing 
 Bob Campbell-Smith – recording, production assistant (3, 5, 6, 7, 9)
 Daniel Kresco – recording assistant 
 Gary Leach – recording assistant, mix assistant 
 Aaron Swihart – recording assistant
 Greg Walker – recording assistant, mix assistant, production assistant (6, 8, 9, 11)
 Jeff Watkins – recording assistant 
 John Kelton – mixing 
 Csaba Petocz – mixing 
 David Hall – mix assistant 
 Glenn Meadows – mastering 
 Neuman, Walker & Associates, Inc. – art direction, design 
 Sue Austin – design coordinator 
 Peter Nash – photography

Studios
 Recorded at Petty Sound Studios (Clovis, New Mexico); Rosewood Studio (Tyler, Texas); Midtown Tone & Volume and OmniSound (Nashville, Tennessee).
 Overdubbed at KD Studios (Nashville, Tennessee).
 Mixed at Masterfonics (Nashville, Tennessee); Petty Sound Studios; Rosewood Studio.
 Mastered at Masterfonics

Charts
Blue debuted at number four on Billboard 200 with 123,000 copies sold in the week ending of July 27, 1996, It peaked at number three in its second week with 129,500 copies sold.

Weekly charts

Decade-end chart

Year-end chart

Sales

See also
1996 in music

References

1996 debut albums
LeAnn Rimes albums
Curb Records albums